Michiganites is a member of the ammonoid order Prolecanitida, named by Ruzhencev in 1962, which comes from the Meramacian stage of Mississippian Period (early Carboniferous Visian).

The shell of Michiganites is discoidal and smooth, as for the family. The ventral lobe of the suture is expanded; three lobes are formed on either side.

Michiganites is placed in the suborder Prolecanitinae (the Prolecanitaceae of Hyatt 1884) and in the family Prolecanitidae along with related genera, Becanites, Dombarocanites, Eocanites, Katacanites, Metacanites, and Prolecanites

References
 GONIAT on line 
  Paleobiology Database
 Treatise on Invertebrate Paleontology, Part L, Ammonoidea; Geological Society of America and University of Kansas Press, 1957.

Mississippian ammonites
Prolecanitida